is a passenger railway station located in the city of Ōme, Tokyo, Japan, operated by East Japan Railway Company (JR East).

Lines
Futamatao Station is served by the Ōme Line, and is located 23.6 kilometers from the starting point of the line at Tachikawa Station.

Station layout
This station consists of a single island platform serving two tracks, connected to the station building by a footbridge. The station is unattended.

Platforms

History
The Ome Electric Railway　was nationalized on 1 April 1944, and absorbed into the Japanese National Railways (JNR). With the privatization of Japanese National Railways (JNR) on 1 April 1987, the station came under the control of JR East.

Passenger statistics
In fiscal 2014, the station was used by an average of 475 passengers daily (boarding passengers only).

Surrounding area
 
 Tama River
 Yoshikawa Eiji Memorial Museum

See also
 List of railway stations in Japan

References

External links 

  

Railway stations in Tokyo
Ōme Line
Stations of East Japan Railway Company
Railway stations in Japan opened in 1920
Ōme, Tokyo